Entre el Amor y el Deseo (Between Love and Desire) is a Mexican telenovela by TV Azteca. It premiered on  2010. The protagonists are the international stars Lorena Rojas and Victor Gonzalez Reynoso. Grand actors such as Fernando Lujan, Hector Bonilla, Alvaro Guerrero, Veronica Merchant, Paco de la O and Gina Morett also included as cast members. This telenovela will be produced by Maria del Carmen Marcos, after her successful work in La Loba.
Shooting of this series will start on 9 August 2010. The series premiered on 27 September 2010, at 10pm, sharing La Lobas timeslot.

Cast
 Lorena Rojas - Claudia Fontana Main Heroin. In love with Luis Carlos and Rafael.
 Víctor González - Luis Carlos Marquez Main Hero. Renata's son. In love with Claudia. Hates Renata
 Margarita Gralia - Renata Dumont Main Villain. Mother of Luis Carlos and Felipe. Patricia's stepmother.
 Fernando Lujan - Edgar Dumont
 Hector Bonilla - Alfredo
 Alexandra Graña - Patricia Dumont
 Martha Aura - Elvira
 Alvaro Guerrero - Fernando
 Verónica Merchant - Muriel
 Francisco de la O - Guillermo De la Garza
 Mauricio Aspe - Marcio Garcia Co-protagonist. Isolda's son, killed by his Renata
 Cinthia Vazquez - Sofia
 Gina Moret - Isolda †
 Jorge Luis Vazquez - Felipe
 Cecilia Ponce - Sara
 Pedro Sicard - Rafael Valdivieso Eliade †
 Sergio Klainer - Sergio Valdivieso †
 Eugenio Montessoro - Andres Dumont †
 Amaranta Ruiz - Gisela
 Mauricio Bonet - Adriano
 Cecilia Piñeiro - Lucia De la Garza
 Dino Garcia - Walter
 Carmen del Valle - Beatriz de De la Garza
 Fernando Rubio - Jeronimo
 Estela Calderon - Dominica
 Angeles Marin - Ana Maria
 Veronica Teran - Raquel
 Adrian Herrera - Gabrielito
 Abel Fernando - Acuña
 Marina Vera - Denise
 Ernesto Diaz del Castillo - Edy
 Ximena Pichel - Estela
 Beatriz Cecilia - Magda
 Paulette Hernandez - Monica
 Yolanda Zuñiga - Toña
 Jose Astorga - Maurice
 Anibal Navarro - Bernardo
 Fania Barron - Marilu
 Emilio Ramos - Ramoncito

Theme songs

"Entre El Amor y El Deseo"
Singer: Carlos Rivera
Writer: Daniel del Rincon Vazquez, Benjamin Rojas Lejia
Editor: TV Azteca Publishing
Copyright Azteca Musica

"Vamos hacer de cuenta"
Singer: JC Sanchez
Music: Lorena Rojas
Writer: Lorena Rojas, Rodolfo Castillo

"Mirame"
Singer: JC Sanchez
Music: Lorena Rojas
Writer: Lorena Rojas, Rodolfo Castillo

"Mesa para dos"
Singer: Lorena Rojas
Music: Lorena Rojas
Writer: Lorena Rojas, Rodolfo Castillo

"Sin ti no se"
Singer: Lorena Rojas
Music: Lorena Rojas, arreglos Kike Santander
Writer: Lorena Rojas

"De acuerdo"
Singer: Lorena Rojas
Music: Lorena Rojas
Writer: Lorena Rojas, Rodolfo Castillo

External links
Intro

References

2010 telenovelas
2010 Mexican television series debuts
2011 Mexican television series endings
Mexican telenovelas
TV Azteca telenovelas
Spanish-language telenovelas
Telenovelas by Gilberto Braga